Lohariya Mota is a village near the town Anjar, the taluka of Kutch district in the Indian state of Gujarat.

History

Lovariya is one of the 18 villages founded by Kutch Gurjar Kshatriyas or Mistris, as they are known in Kutch. These Mistris first moved into Saurashtra in early 7th century and later a major group entered Kutch in 12th Century & established themselves at Dhaneti. Later from 12th century onwards they moved to settle themselves between  Anjar and Bhuj and founded the villages of Anjar, Sinugra, Khambhra, Nagalpar, Khedoi, Madhapar, Hajapar, Kukma, Galpadar, Reha, Vidi, Ratnal, Jambudi, Devaliya, Lovaria, Nagor, Chandiya, Meghpar and Kumbharia.

About Village

Kuldevi Temples of many clans of these Kutch Gurjar Kshatriyas community are also there in this village.

Village is located 14 km from nearest town Anjar. Villagers enjoy very good drinking water supply, and very Electricity supply with very less power shortages.
Village has good amount Telephone penetration, and nearly most of the houses has televisions and Cable supply.
Village Entrance greets with Welcome gate.

Culture
Most of the people in Lovaria are of Parmar & Chawda clan belonging to Mistri or Kutch Gurjar Kshatriyas community.

References

Villages in Kutch district